Bringing Up Buddy is an American situation comedy that aired on CBS during the 1960-61 television season. It depicts a young bachelor who lives with the two maiden aunts who raised him.

Synopsis
After Richard David "Buddy" Flower's parents died in an automobile accident during his childhood, his maiden aunts Violet ("Vi") and Iris raised him. Now a young bachelor, he still resides with Vi and Iris at 1492 Maple Street in the small town of Bradley Falls, California, and their antics and meddling in his life present endless complications for him. An investment broker at Cooper Investments, where he is romantically involved with his secretary, Kathy Donnell, Buddy often comes home from work to find that his lovable-but-wacky aunts have made some major decision about his life for him, such as finding him the perfect girl to marry, or have gotten themselves in trouble of some kind that he has to get them out of.

Cast
 Richard David "Buddy" Flower...Frank Aletter
 Aunt Violet "Vi" Flower...Enid Markey
 Aunt Iris Flower...Doro Merande
 Kathy Donnell...Nancy Rennick

Production notes
Bringing Up Buddy was created and produced by Joe Connelly and Bob Mosher. It was a production of Kayro-Vue Productions and Revue Studios.

Broadcast schedule
Bringing Up Buddy lasted a single season. Its 36 episodes were broadcast in the United States on CBS at 8:30 PM Eastern Time on Monday nights from October 10, 1960, through July 3, 1961. Episodes then ran as summer repeats in the same timeslot until September 25, 1961.

Episodes
SOURCES

References

External links
 
 Bringing Up Buddy opening credits on YouTube

1960 American television series debuts
1961 American television series endings
1960s American sitcoms
Black-and-white American television shows
CBS original programming
English-language television shows
Television series about families
Television shows set in California